Cornus capitata is a species of dogwood known by the common names Bentham's cornel, evergreen dogwood, Himalayan flowering dogwood,  and Himalayan strawberry-tree. It is native to the low-elevation woodlands of the Himalayas in China, India, Pakistan, Nepal, and Bhutan. It is naturalized in parts of Australia and New Zealand, but is also grown elsewhere as an ornamental. This is an evergreen tree growing to 12 meters in height and width. The leaves are gray-green and pale and fuzzy underneath, and several centimeters long. It flowers during the summer in white blooms. The infructescence is a small aggregate of several individual fruits fused into a red body 2 or 3 centimeters across. It is edible but sometimes bitter. There are several varieties and hybrids.

The species is naturalised in the states of New South Wales and Victoria in Australia. 

The common name Bentham's cornel derives from the alternative label Benthamia fragifera, coined by John Lindley in honour of fellow botanist George Bentham.

References

External links

 
 Canopy Trees

capitata
Trees of China
Trees of the Indian subcontinent
Trees of Myanmar